Eugen Leibfried (16 April 1897 – 12 October 1978) was a German politician of the Christian Democratic Union (CDU) and former member of the German Bundestag.

Life 
After 1945 he joined the CDU and became a member of the district council of the district of Mosbach in 1946. In 1949 he was elected to the first German Bundestag in the Sinsheim constituency. In the 1953 election he was able to maintain his direct mandate. Because of his ministerial activities in the state of Baden-Württemberg, Leibfried resigned from his office as a member of the Bundestag on 21 June 1956.

Literature

References

1897 births
1978 deaths
Members of the Bundestag for Baden-Württemberg
Members of the Bundestag 1953–1957
Members of the Bundestag 1949–1953
Members of the Bundestag for the Christian Democratic Union of Germany
Members of the Landtag of Baden-Württemberg
Grand Crosses with Star and Sash of the Order of Merit of the Federal Republic of Germany
Recipients of the Order of Merit of Baden-Württemberg